Nektarios N. Tavernarakis (Greek: Νεκτάριος Ν. Ταβερναράκης) is a bioscientist, who studies Ageing, Cell death, and Neurodegeneration. He is currently Professor of Molecular Systems Biology at the Medical School of the University of Crete, and the Chairman of the Board of Directors at the Foundation for Research and Technology, in Heraklion, Crete, Greece.  He is also the founder and first Director of the Graduate Program in Bioinformatics of the University of Crete Medical School, and has served as Director of the Institute of Molecular Biology and Biotechnology, where he is heading the Neurogenetics and Ageing laboratory. He was elected Vice President of the European Research Council (ERC) in 2020, and Chairman of the European Institute of Innovation and Technology (EIT) Governing Board and Executive Committee in 2022.

Biographical information 
Nektarios Tavernarakis completed his undergraduate studies at the Department of Biology of the Aristotle University, in Thessaloniki, Greece, and obtained his PhD degree from the Department of Biology of the University of Crete, in Heraklion, Greece. He trained as a postdoctoral researcher at the Department of Molecular Biology & Biochemistry of Rutgers University in New Jersey, USA. He has made notable contributions relevant to cell death, neurodegeneration and ageing, documented in the scientific literature.

In 2020, Nektarios Tavernarakis was elected Vice President of the European Research Council (ERC), and in 2022, he became Chairman of the European Institute of Innovation and Technology (EIT) Governing Board, He is a member of the European Molecular Biology Organization (EMBO), Academia Europaea and the European Academy of Sciences and Arts. He is also a corresponding member of the Academy of Athens.

His work has received several prominent awards and scientific prizes, including two European Research Council (ERC) Advanced Investigator grant awards (in 2008 and 2016), a European Research Council (ERC) Proof of Concept grant award, the EMBO Young Investigator award, the International Human Frontier Science Program (HFSP) long-term postdoctoral fellowship, the BioMedical Research Award of the Academy of Athens, the Valergakis Post-Graduate Award of the Hellenic University Club of New York, the Galien Scientific Research Award, the Helmholtz International Fellow Award, the Bodossaki Foundation Scientific Prize for Medicine and Biology, the Alexander von Humboldt Foundation, Friedrich Wilhelm Bessel research award, the Research Excellence award of the Foundation for Research and Technology, and the Empeirikeion Foundation Academic Excellence Prize, among others.

Research and scientific achievements 
Nektarios Tavernarakis has contributed to the elucidation of the molecular mechanisms of necrotic cell death and neurodegeneration, the interplay between cellular metabolism and ageing, the mechanisms of sensory transduction and integration by the nervous system.  He has also contributed towards the development of novel genetic tools for biomedical research, including an RNA interference (RNAi) method that allows efficient knockdown of neuronal genes. His PhD Thesis research focused on the expression and function of key stress response transcriptional activators in the yeast Saccharomyces cerevisiae, and provided original insights on the regulation of these activators by nutrient limitation, and the role of DNA in determining interactions between transcription factors and co-factors. His laboratory at IMBB was the first to commence Caenorhabditis elegans research in Greece. Among the notable discoveries of his team are the sophisticated molecular mechanisms, by which diverse physiological signals are integrated to modulate cellular mitochondrial content, protein synthesis, and energy homeostasis during ageing. These studies revealed intricate signaling pathways that coordinate mitophagy and mitochondrial biogenesis, to determine the number of mitochondria in cells, under stress and during ageing. Work from his lab implicated autophagy, lysosomal function, endocytosis, intracellular calcium homeostasis and specific proteolytic enzymes as major contributors to necrosis and neurodegeneration. His group developed, for the first time, experimental heat stroke models; and identified mechanisms protecting against heat cytotoxicity and other necrotic insults. He has isolated and characterized specific ion channels, involved in proprioception and coordinated locomotion, in dopaminergic signalling and associative learning. His team was the first to delineate the role of autophagy in the regulation of synaptic plasticity and behaviour under nutrient deprivation and stress. Work in his laboratory also led to the identification of specific nuclear autophagy mediators and the characterization of their role in ageing and germline immortality.

Selected awards and distinctions 
 Elected Fellow of the Royal Society of Biology (FRSB), London, UK (2023)
 Elected Chairman of the European Institute of Innovation and Technology (EIT) Governing Board and Executive Committee (2022)
 Fellow of the American Association for the Advancement of Science (AAAS) (2020)
 Elected Vice President, Scientific Council of the European Research Council (ERC) (2020)
 Member of the European Institute of Innovation and Technology (EIT) Governing Board and Executive Committee (2020)
 Member of the German National Academy of Sciences-Leopoldina (2019)
 Corresponding Member of the Academy of Athens (2019) 
 Member of the European Academy of Sciences and Arts (2018)
 Helmholtz International Fellow Award (2017)
 Galien Scientific Research Award (2017)
 Honorary Education Business Award (2017)
 Member of the Scientific Council of the European Research Council (ERC) (2016)
 European Research Council (ERC), Advanced Investigator Grant award (2016)
 Research Support Award, Fondation Santé (2015)
 BioMedical Research Excellence Award, Academy of Athens, (2014)
 Member of Academia Europaea (2014)
 Empeirikeion Foundation, Academic Excellence Prize (2012)
 Excellence Professor, Medical School, University of Crete (2010)
 Member of the European Molecular Biology Organization (EMBO) (2009)
 European Research Council (ERC), Advanced Investigator Grant award (2008)
 Foundation for Research and Technology, Research Excellence award (2007)
 Alexander von Humboldt, Friedrich Wilhelm Bessel Research award (2007)
 Member of the Faculty of 1000 in Biology/Medicine, section on Cellular Death & Stress Responses (2006)
 Bodossaki Foundation, Academic Prize in Medicine and Biology (2005)
 European Molecular Biology Organization (EMBO) Young Investigator (2002–2005)
 International Human Frontier Science Program Organization (HFSPO) fellow (1996–2000)
 State of New Jersey, Commission on Cancer Research fellow (1996)
 Hellenic University Club of New York, Frederick Valergakis, Academic achievement award (1996)

Selected publications

References

External links
 Google Scholar, Nektarios Tavernarakis
 Tavernarakis Lab
 Institute of Molecular Biology and Biotechnology
 Foundation for Research and Technology - Hellas
 Medical School, University of Crete
 Graduate Program in Bioinformatics
 University of Crete

Biogerontologists
Cell biologists
Greek geneticists
Greek medical researchers
Greek neuroscientists
Living people
Molecular biologists
Greek physiologists
Systems biologists
Academic staff of the University of Crete
University of Crete alumni
Aristotle University of Thessaloniki alumni
1967 births
Scientists from Heraklion
Members of the Academy of Athens (modern)